
Płock County is a unit of territorial administration and local government (powiat) in Masovian Voivodeship, east-central Poland. It came into being on January 1, 1999, as a result of the Polish local government reforms passed in 1998. Its administrative seat is the city of Płock, although the city is not part of the county (it constitutes a separate city county).

As of 2019 its total population is 110,987, out of which the population of Gąbin is 4,125, that of Drobin is 2,872, that of Wyszogród is 2,601, and the rural population is 101,389.

Neighbouring counties
Apart from the city of Płock, Płock County is also bordered by Sierpc County to the north, Płońsk County to the east, Sochaczew County to the south-east, Gostynin County to the south-west, Włocławek County to the west and Lipno County to the north-west.

Administrative division
The county is subdivided into 15 gminas (three urban-rural and 12 rural). These are listed in the following table, in descending order of population.

References

 
Land counties of Masovian Voivodeship
Płock